Tacoma is a city in Pierce County, Washington, United States.

Tacoma may also refer to:

Places

Australia
 Tacoma, New South Wales, a suburb of the Central Coast region of New South Wales, Australia.

United States
Lake Tacoma, a proglacial lake in Washington state.
Tacoma, Ohio, an unincorporated community
Tacoma, Virginia, an unincorporated community 
Mount Rainier in Washington, also known as Tacoma or Tahoma

Ships
 Tacoma-class frigate, a class of United States Navy ships
 MV Tacoma, a Washington State ferry in the United States
 , several United States Navy warships
 Tacoma (steamship), a steamship built in 1913

Other uses
 Toyota Tacoma, a pickup truck manufactured since 1995
 Tacoma Dome, an indoor arena in Tacoma, Washington
 Tacoma Stars, an indoor soccer team in Kent, Washington
 Tacoma Guitars, a manufacturer of acoustic guitars in Tacoma, Washington
 Tacoma Motley, Mike and Mabel Motley's daughter-in-law, and Truman Motley's wife in the 1976-2000 comic strip, Motley's Crew
 Tacoma (video game), a video game by Fullbright released in 2017
 Tacoma nyssaecolella, a moth in the family Pyralidae

See also
Tacoma Narrows, a narrow passage in Puget Sound near Tacoma
Tacoma Narrows bridges, a series of bridges over the narrows
Tahoma (disambiguation)
Takoma (disambiguation)
Tecoma (disambiguation)